The 1994 Southwest Conference women's basketball tournament was held March 9–12, 1994, at Moody Coliseum in Dallas, Texas. 

Number 3 seed  defeated 1 seed  71–69 to win their 9th championship and receive the conference's automatic bid to the 1994 NCAA tournament.

Format and seeding 
The tournament consisted of an 8 team single-elimination tournament.

Tournament

References 

Southwest Conference women's Basketball Tournament
1994 in American women's basketball
Basketball in Dallas
1994 in sports in Texas